Kenmoor may refer to:

Kenmoor, Missouri, U.S., unincorporated community
Kenmoor Middle School, Landover, Maryland, U.S.

See also
Kenmore (disambiguation)